Robot Taekwon V (로보트 태권 V) is a South Korean animated film directed by Kim Cheong-gi and produced by Yu Hyun-mok, the prominent director of such films as Obaltan (오발탄) (Aimless Bullet) (1960). It was released on July 24, 1976, immediately becoming a hit in the late 1970s, and consequently inspired a string of sequels in following years. Robot Taekwon V was released in the United States in a dubbed format under the name Voltar the Invincible. Robot Taekwon V became the first Korean film to receive full digital restoration treatment in 2005.

Plot
Dr. Kaff (or Dr. Cops; 카프 박사 in Korean), an evil scientist bent on world domination, creates an army of giant robots to kidnap world-class athletes and conquer the world. To fight off this attack, Dr. Kim creates Robot Taekwon V. Kim Hoon, the taekwon-do champion and the eldest son of Dr Kim, pilots Robot Taekwon V either mechanically or through his physical power by merging his taekwon-do movements with the robot.

Comic relief is provided by Kim Hoon's younger buddy, elementary school student Kim Cheol. He has fashioned himself as "Tin-Can Robot Cheol" by cutting eyeholes in a tea kettle and wearing it on his head. Kim Hoon's girlfriend, Yoon Yeong-hee, is a pilot and taekwon-do practitioner. She can also operate Robot Taekwon V with buttons and levers, and pilots Kim Hoon in and out of the robot.

Specifications of Taekwon V 
Robot Taekwon V's Digital Restoration According to the film's homepage, it is 56 meters tall, weighs 1400 tons, and power is 8.95 million kilowatts. According to an article published on May 31, 1999, 39 to 42 meters in height and 3,500 tons in weight (when viewing the height of the TaekwonV is 40 meters), the power is up to 31,700 kilowatt hours per hour.

Plagiarism 
The Japanese giant-robot manga and anime Mazinger Z was popular in South Korea at the time of Robot Taekwon V'''s creation, and Kim Cheong-gi freely discusses the plagiarism of Mazinger Z on his animated film, saying he wanted to create a Korean hero for Korean children. In order to emphasize the Korean ties of the film, he had leading characters perform the traditional martial art, taekwondo, and gave the robot the ability to do taekwondo kicks.

The sequel, Super Taekwon V, took designs from Gundam and Xabungle.

Restoration
The original print of Robot Taekwon V has long been thought lost, and for years the only available print was incomplete and in very poor condition. However, a duplicate print was discovered in a warehouse of the Korean Film Commission in July 2003. Beginning in August of that year, the Korean Film Council made the film the subject of a 2-year restoration project budgeted at 1 billion won. 72 people were involved in cleaning up and digitizing each of the 108,852 frames. The original mono soundtrack was transferred to Dolby Digital 5.1. The restored version premiered at the Pusan International Film Festival on October 6, 2005.

In late 2006, Taekwon mania soared to new levels with a celebrity attended gala event in Seoul celebrating the 30th birthday of the robot and film. In 2007 yet more giant 3 meter tall size statues of Taekwon V have appeared around Seoul; instead of fronting art galleries in the hip areas of Hongdae and Insadong, one of the statues landed outside of the National Assembly (parliament) building. The restoration was widely released in early 2007 and set a new record for domestic animated films, attracting over 600,000 viewers in 18 days.

SequelsRobot Taekwon V'' has inspired a number of film and comic book sequels. The film sequels include:
 로보트 태권V 우주작전 (Robot Taekwon V: Space Mission) (December 13, 1976)
 로보트 태권V 수중특공대 (Robot Taekwon V: Underwater Rangers) (July 20, 1977)
 로보트 태권V 대 황금날개의 대결 (Robot Taekwon V vs. Golden Wings Showdown) (July 26, 1978)
 날아라! 우주전함 거북선 (Fly! Spaceship Geobukseon) (July 26, 1979)
 슈퍼 태권V (Super Taekwon V) (July 30, 1982)
 '84 태권V (84 Taekwon V) (August 3, 1984)
 로보트 태권V 90 (Robot Taekwon V 90) (July 28, 1990)

Notes

References
 
 
 
IMDB page on original film
KOFIC unveils restored Robot Taekwon V (1976) at Korean Film Council
Robot Taekwon V, at Yahoo Korea Movies (in Korean)
'Robot Taekwon V' gets back again (2005/05/15) at Han Cinema
ロボットテコンＶ (RobottoTekon V) at History of robot anime of South Korea　(in Japanese, with images & video clip)
Taekwon V Movie Restoration And Plagiarism Claims

Powell, Alex J. Korean Animation. Swindle Magazine. Issue 10 2007.

External links
Korea Society Podcast: Our Toys, Our Selves: Robot Taekwon V and South Korean Identity

See also
List of animated feature-length films

1976 films
1976 animated films
1970s science fiction films
South Korean animated science fiction films
Fictional taekwondo practitioners
Films directed by Kim Cheong-gi